Bloody Tuesday is a term used to refer to certain events which occurred on a Tuesday:

 two die when gunfire erupts during the San Francisco Streetcar Strike of 1907
 one day in the 1913 Ipswich Mills strike
 one day in the African Mine Workers' Strike in 1946
 the start of the April Revolution, South Korea, 1960
 Bloody Tuesday (1964), Civil Rights marchers attacked by police in Tuscaloosa, Alabama
 "Bloody Tuesday", an episode in the Polish animated series Włatcy móch

See also
 Black Tuesday (disambiguation)

Tuesday